Harry Kendall (?-2015) was an English wrestler who competed for England.

Wrestling career
He represented England and won a bronze medal in the -82 kg division at the 1954 British Empire and Commonwealth Games in Vancouver, Canada. He also represented England in the -90 Kg at the 1958 British Empire and Commonwealth Games in Cardiff, Wales.

As a professional he was called one of the original Silent Ones alongside Mike Eagers because they were deaf.

References

2015 deaths
British male sport wrestlers
Wrestlers at the 1954 British Empire and Commonwealth Games
Wrestlers at the 1958 British Empire and Commonwealth Games
Commonwealth Games medallists in wrestling
Commonwealth Games bronze medallists for England
Medallists at the 1954 British Empire and Commonwealth Games